A steamed cheeseburger, also referred to as a steamer or cheeseburg, is a hamburger topped with cheese that is cooked via steaming and originally only served by restaurants in central Connecticut in the United States.  Despite it now being available elsewhere, it is still difficult to find outside this area.

Preparation
What makes the steamed cheeseburger different from typical cheeseburgers is the way it is prepared. Instead of being fried in a pan or grilled on a grill, it is steamed in a stainless-steel cabinet containing trays that hold either a hamburger patty or a chunk of cheese. This method of cooking makes the fats in the meat melt away and they are then drained from the tray once the patty is fully cooked. The end result is a moist, juicy burger which is then served by scooping the meat onto a bun and then pouring the melted cheese over the meat. Various customary toppings can then be added to the burger.

Invention
The steamed cheeseburger is believed to have been invented at a restaurant called Jack's Lunch in Middletown, Connecticut, in either the 1920s or 1930s. Jack's Lunch was located at 434 Main Street and operated by Jack Fitzgerald for 44 years. The steamed cheeseburgers at Jack's Lunch were "cooked in a tall copper box filled with simmering water for 18 tin trays of square ground-beef patties." Cheddar cheese was an option at an additional 5 cents.  One theory as to what sparked the idea for the steamed cheeseburger is back in the 1920s steaming was being touted as a healthy alternative to frying in that steamed food was easier to digest than fried food.

Availability and distribution in central Connecticut
Ted's Restaurant in Meriden is the most famous eatery that serves steamed cheeseburgers due to media coverage, but they are also available at establishments in the adjacent towns of Wallingford, Middletown, Portland, and Cromwell; further east in East Hampton; and further south in North Haven. Ted's also operates a food truck called the Steam Machine that sells steamed cheeseburgers further north at UConn Huskies football games at Pratt & Whitney Stadium at Rentschler Field in East Hartford, Bushnell Park in downtown Hartford, and the Xfinity Theatre amphitheatre in Hartford. Ted's also has a concession stand behind section 101 inside the XL Center arena in Hartford.

Hartford Yard Goats promotion
During the 2018 Minor League Baseball season, the Hartford Yard Goats played one home game as the "Hartford Steamed Cheeseburgers". Special one-off uniforms resembling the food item were worn by the players and made-to-order steamed cheeseburgers from Ted's Restaurant were available for fans to purchase.

See also
 List of hamburgers
 List of steamed foods

References

New England cuisine
Hamburgers (food)